Nguyễn Thu Thuỷ (June 20, 1976 – June 5, 2021) was a Vietnamese beauty pageant winner, who was crowned as the 4th Miss Vietnam in 1994 when she was a first year student at the Institute for International Relations (Cung Văn hóa Hữu nghị Việt - Xô) in Hanoi.

Biography
Nguyễn Thu Thuỷ was born into an intelligentsia family. Her father, Nguyễn Văn Lợi, and mother were civil servants in the Linguistics Institute of Vietnam (Viện Ngôn ngữ học).

Nguyễn Thu Thuỷ studied business administration in the United States for 2 years and owned a beauty salon chain in Hanoi.

She was married and had two children. On 5 June 2021, Nguyễn Thu Thuỷ died from a sudden cardiac arrest after feeling unwell for a few days.

Miss Viet Nam 1994 
The winner: Nguyễn Thu Thuỷ  (Hà Nội)
1st runner-up: Tô Hương Lan (Tuyên Quang)
2nd runner-up: Trịnh Kim Chi (Ho Chi Minh City)

Television shows
21st Century Man (on 5 June 2007, as jury woman)

References

External links
 Miss Vietnam 1994 official website

1976 births
2021 deaths
Miss Vietnam winners
People from Hanoi
Deaths from cerebrovascular disease